The Circuito dos Cristais is a race track located in the Brazilian city of Curvelo, in the state of Minas Gerais.

The venue opened in 2016, and hosted rounds of the Stock Car Brasil and Copa Truck.

Lap records

The official fastest lap records at the Circuito dos Cristais are listed as:

References 

Sports venues in Minas Gerais
Sports venues completed in 2016
Cristais
2016 establishments in Brazil